Harry Herbert Pace (January 6, 1884 – July 19, 1943) was an American music publisher and insurance executive. He was the founder of Black Swan Records, the first record label owned by an African American with wide distribution capabilities.

Early life
Harry Pace was born in Covington, Georgia. According to a 1917 biography Pace's "Grandfather was brought from Virginia to Georgia during the days of slavery, but was manumitted by his master, to whom he was related." There is little known about his parents. He finished elementary school at the age of twelve.

Career
Pace enrolled at Atlanta University and found work as a printer's devil to pay his way through school. However, after learning that white employees were earning more than black employees, Pace left the job and began working odd jobs on campus instead. It was at Atlanta University that Pace met W. E. B. Du Bois, who was one of his teachers. Pace graduated valedictorian of his class in 1903. He was 19 years old. 

After receiving a degree, Pace went into the printing business with W. E. B. Du Bois in Memphis. Two years later they put together the short-lived magazine The Moon Illustrated Weekly.

In 1912, Pace met and collaborated with W. C. Handy, who took a liking to him; they wrote songs together. In Memphis, Pace also met and married Ethylene Bibb. Pace and Handy founded the Pace and Handy Music Company, which brought Pace to New York City. Around 1920, the company began working with composers William Grant Still and Fletcher Henderson. Although the company did well, their business consisted largely of writing and selling sheet music to be played at home, commonly called parlour music.  Pace saw the growing popularity of the phonograph would shift the music business as it reached a wider audience.  Handy had no interest in changing the business and Pace resigned.

In 1917, Pace, along with James Weldon Johnson, Dr. Charles S. Johnson, Dr. Louis T. Wright and Walter Francis White, chartered the Atlanta Branch of the NAACP.

In 1921, then living in Harlem, Pace established Black Swan Records. On the recommendation of W. E. B. Du Bois, the label was named for singer Elizabeth Taylor Greenfield, who was called "the Black Swan." At the time of the establishment of the label, Pace declared  They had offices in the Gaiety Theatre office building in Times Square. Pace also set up a recording studio in the basement of his brownstone.

For his record company, Pace brought in Henderson as recording manager and Still as arranger. His first releases featured performances of light classical music, blues, spirituals, and instrumental solos. Black Swan’s first hit was a recording of "Down Home Blues" and "Oh, Daddy", sung by Ethel Waters. Although Pace recorded many outstanding artists, the business failed and Pace was forced to declare bankruptcy in December 1923. A few months later, he sold Black Swan to Paramount Records.

In 1925, Pace founded the Northeastern Life Insurance Company in Newark, New Jersey, which became the largest African-American-owned business in the North during the 1930s.

Pace then moved to Chicago to attend the Chicago-Kent College of Law; he received his degree in 1933. As a lawyer, he was involved with the Hansberry v. Lee case. Around this time, he began passing for White and opened a law firm in downtown Chicago in 1942. His progeny would not discover his African ancestry until well after his death.

Pace died on July 19, 1943, in Chicago, and is buried in Woodlawn Cemetery in the Bronx, New York.

Legacy
Pace is featured on the documentary series Profiles of African-American Success. In 2021, Pace was profiled in Jad Abumrad and Shima Oliaee's miniseries The Vanishing of Harry Pace on Radiolab. In the series Harry Pace's descendants as well as scholars are interviewed. Harry Pace's great-grandson Eric Pace and his wife Candace Edwards are featured on episode 3 in which they discuss their musical project "THE PACES".

References

 Miles, J. H., Davis, J. J., Ferguson-Roberts, S. E., and Giles, R. G. (2001). Almanac of African American Heritage. Paramus, NJ: Prentice Hall Press.
 Potter, J. (2002). African American Firsts. New York, NY: Kensington Publishing Corp.

External links
Black Swan Records founder Harry Pace, an original!, The African American Registry.
"The Rise and Fall of Black Swan Records", Weusi, Jitu K. (2001).
Radiolab - the vanishing of Harry Pace.

American music industry executives
1884 births
1943 deaths
People from Covington, Georgia
Chicago-Kent College of Law alumni
Atlanta University alumni
Burials at Woodlawn Cemetery (Bronx, New York)
African-American company founders
NAACP activists
20th-century African-American people